The Republican is a newspaper based in Springfield, Massachusetts covering news in the Greater Springfield area, as well as national news and pieces from Boston, Worcester and northern Connecticut.  It is owned by Newhouse Newspapers, a division of Advance Publications. During the 19th century the paper, once the largest circulating daily in New England, played a key role in the United States Republican Party's founding, Charles Dow's career, and the invention of the honorific "Ms." Despite the decline of printed media, The Republican was the 69th largest newspaper in 2017 with a circulation of 76,353. Content from The Republican is published online to MassLive, a separate Advance Publications company. MassLive had a record 6 million unique monthly visitors in June 2019.

Beginning
Established by Samuel Bowles II in 1824 as a rural weekly, it was converted into a daily in 1844.  From the beginning it had a focus on local news. As rapidly as possible its news-gathering was extended until within a few years its columns contained departments of items from every town and hamlet along the Connecticut Valley, as well as from Springfield.  It achieved national renown in the 19th century under the tenure of Samuel Bowles III, a legacy that was passed to his son, Samuel Bowles IV.

Politics

 

In 1855, Bowles III called for the founding of a new party that would abolish slavery.  He suggested the name "Republican".  Once abolitionists founded a party by this name, The Republican became one of its most unrelenting supporters.

Bowles III believed that the newspaper should be a power in the moral, religious, and literary, as well as the political life of the community, and he tried to make his paper fulfill those functions. With the aid of J. G. Holland and others who joined the staff the paper attained excellent literary quality and a high moral tone. Its opinions soon reached all New England, and after the formation of the Republican party they extended far beyond the limits of any section.

During the controversies affecting slavery and resulting in the American Civil War, Bowles supported, in general, the Whig and Republican parties, but in the period of Reconstruction under President Ulysses S. Grant, his paper represented anti-administration or Liberal Republican opinions, while in the disputed election of 1876 it favored the claims of Samuel J. Tilden, and subsequently became independent in politics.  Its editorial board endorsed the Democratic candidate for president in every modern election except the 2008 election, in which it endorsed John McCain, but subsequently endorsed Barack Obama in the 2012 election.

Other
During Bowles' lifetime, and subsequently, the Republican office was a sort of school for young journalists, especially in the matter of pungency and conciseness of style, one of his maxims being: "put it all in the first paragraph".

Bowles was an acquaintance of Emily Dickinson, and he published a handful of the very few poems by the poet printed in her lifetime, including "A narrow fellow in the grass" and "Safe in their alabaster chambers".

Bowles was succeeded as publisher and editor-in-chief of the Republican by his son Samuel Bowles (b. 1851).

Charles Dow, founder of Dow Jones and The Wall Street Journal, started his career as a business reporter for the Springfield Daily Republican, as an apprentice to the newspaper's then-owner, Samuel Bowles III.

The title "Ms." was first suggested by an anonymous 1901 letter to The Republican.  The letter read, in part, "To call a maiden Mrs. is only a shade worse than to insult a matron with the inferior title Miss. Yet it is not always easy to know the facts... The abbreviation 'Ms.' is simple, it is easy to write, and the person concerned can translate it properly according to the circumstances."

The second half of the 20th century saw the consolidation of Springfield's newspapers.  The Republican became part of two other local papers.  The Springfield Daily News and the Morning Union merged in the 1970s, briefly operating as separate papers, even endorsing different candidates for the same offices.  Eventually the two editions were combined into The Union-News (a morning paper) in 1988, with The Sunday Republican being published on Sundays.  An organization called the Springfield Newspapers became the local division of the Newhouse family empire.  The newspaper was formerly known as The Springfield Union News & Sunday Republican.

The Republican launched the careers of several prominent journalists and novelists.  I. E. "Sy" Sanborn, longtime Chicago sportswriter and one of the original organizers of the Baseball Writers' Association of America in 1908, began his career at The Republican. Radio's "poet laureate" Norman Corwin was a reporter for The Republican in the 1930s.  Novelist Tom Wolfe was a reporter for The Springfield Union in the late 1950s.

The newspaper reverted to its historical, pre-Union-News name of The Republican around 2001. George Arwady became publisher of The Republican on December 31, 2009;  he was previously publisher of The Newark Star-Ledger, where he had threatened to shut down that newspaper amid financial crises.

In 2019, the New England Newspaper Association awarded The Republican, the "Newspaper of the Year" title as a daily, and among Sunday newspapers, for its investigative reporting on the Springfield Police Department controversies earlier that year.

Longtime editor and Yankee Quill winner Wayne E. Phaneuf retired in 2020 and was succeeded by Cynthia G. Simison and later Larry Parnass .

Images

See also
 Republican Block, the newspaper's home from 1858 to 1867
 History of American newspapers

Notes

References

 Parts of this article come from 

Cambridge History of English and American uLiterature (1921) in the public domain.''

External links

 The Republican, online edition
 Other publications by The Republican
 George S. Merriam, Life and Times of Samuel Bowles V. 1 (1885)
 Richard Hooker, The Story of an Independent Newspaper (1924)
 John J. Scanlon, The Passing of the Springfield Republican (1950)

1824 establishments in Massachusetts
Advance Publications
Mass media in Springfield, Massachusetts
Newspapers published in Massachusetts
Publications established in 1824